Live at the International, Las Vegas  is a live album by Jerry Lee Lewis that was released on Mercury Records in 1970.

Background
After a full decade in a commercial abyss, by 1970 Jerry Lee Lewis was one of the hottest country stars in the business after hit singles like "What's Made Milwaukee Famous (Has Made a Loser Out of Me)" and "She Still Comes Around (To Love What's Left of Me)" had rocketed up the charts. With his albums selling again, he appeared in front of 25,000 fans at the Toronto Peace Festival in 1969 and later that year performed on his own television special called The Many Sounds of Jerry Lee Lewis. In early 1970, he appeared on The Johnny Cash Show and, with his profile higher than it had been since his Sun Records days, was invited to play the International Hotel in Las Vegas. Befitting his new role as a honky-tonk balladeer, Lewis kept it mostly country, performing his recent hits and other songs made famous by Bob Wills, Hank Williams, and Tom T. Hall. The album would be another hit for Lewis, rising to number 5 on the Billboard country albums chart.

Lewis played Vegas at the same time as Elvis Presley, who was enjoying his own comeback around this time. According to Rick Bragg's authorized biography Jerry Lee Lewis: His Own Story, in 1969 Presley tracked Jerry Lee down at a hotel in Columbus, Ohio and invited him to see his show at the International, an invitation Lewis accepted. According to Lewis guitarist Kenny Lovelace, when Presley introduced Lewis during the show, the audience gave him a standing ovation. The next year, Lewis would be playing the International with his own band while Elvis played in the main room. "I was playin' in the lounge," he recounts to Bragg. "I mean, the lounge was as big...It was as large as this whole house. Just the lounge. I mean, the main room would seat, like, three thousand people. And the room I was in would seat, like, twenty-five hundred. I was hittin' Elvis tit for tat on that."  Lewis added that he was largely unimpressed by Presley's show: "He had an enlarged band, with horns and violins, stuff like that, and I don't think it ever come off that good. He was tryin' to prove somethin' that really didn't need provin'."  In the 1982 book Hellfire, biographer Nick Tosches reports of an alleged exchange between the two at the time, with Lewis telling Elvis, "You don't know what you're doin'. You're just Colonel Parker's puppet."  "Well," Elvis replied, "if I'm so dumb and you're so smart, how is it that I'm playin' the main room and you're playin' the lounge?"

Track listing
"She Even Woke Me Up to Say Goodbye" (Doug Gilmore, Mickey Newbury)
"Jambalaya" (Hank Williams)
"She Still Comes Around (To Love What's Left of Me)" (Glenn Sutton)
"Drinking Champagne" (Bill Mack Smith)
"San Antonio Rose" (Bob Wills)
"Once More with Feeling" (Kris Kristofferson, Shel Silverstein)
"When You Wore a Tulip (And I Wore a Big Red Rose)" ** (Jack Mahoney, Percy Wenrich)
"Take These Chains from My Heart" * (Hy Heath, Fred Rose)
"The Ballad of Forty Dollars" (Tom T. Hall)
"Flip, Flop and Fly" (Charles Calhoun, Lou Willie Turner)
"You Went Out of Your Way (To Walk on Me)" (Paul Craft)
"My Only Claim to Fame" (Glenn Sutton)
"Brown Eyed Handsome Man" (Chuck Berry)

Personnel
Jerry Lee Lewis - vocals, piano
Linda Gail Lewis - vocals (*solo) (**duet)
Buck Hutcheson - guitar
Ned Davis - steel guitar
Kenny Lovelace - fiddle, guitar
Eddie DeBruhl - bass
Morris Tarrant - drums
Jerry Lee Lewis Jr. - tambourine

References

1970 live albums
Jerry Lee Lewis albums
Albums produced by Jerry Kennedy
Mercury Records live albums
Albums recorded at Westgate Las Vegas